Ocinara albicollis is a moth in the family Bombycidae. It was described by Francis Walker in 1862. It is found in Kenya, China, Thailand, Malaysia, India, Sri Lanka and on Sumatra, Java and Borneo. The habitat consists of lower and upper montane forests, but it has also been recorded in the lowlands.

References

Bombycidae
Moths described in 1862